Square One is a 1997 Australian film directed by Robert Herbert.

Plot
Vicky and Billy T become involved in the mod subculture.

Cast
Teo Gebert as Billy T
Aaron Jeffery
Tara Morice
Michaela Noonan as Vicky

Awards
Best director and best actor at the St Kilda Film Festival in Melbourne
Silver Spire prize at the San Francisco Film Festival
Nominated Best Film 1995 Sydney Film Festival Dendy Awards

References

External links

Square One at Screen Australia

Australian drama films
1997 films
1990s English-language films
1990s Australian films